Wawa may refer to:

People
Wawa (Taiwanese singer) (born 1964), Taiwanese singer
Vava (rapper) (born 1995), Chinese rapper
Wawa, stage name of deaf American rapper and dancer Warren Snipe
Wawa (Malagasy musician)
Wawa of Mataram, king of Mataram in Central Java, Indonesia, from 924 to 929
Serge Wawa (born 1986), Ivorian football defender
Harrison Chongo (1969–2011), Zambian footballer nicknamed "Wawa"
Wawrzyniec Żuławski (1916–1957), Polish mountaineer, composer and writer also known as "Wawa"
Warren Barguil (born 1991), French racing cyclist nicknamed "Wawa"
Waawa or Wawa people, an ethnic group of Nigeria, and their language

Places

Canada
Wawa, Ontario, a township
Wawa Lake, Ontario
Wawa subprovince, a geological subprovince of the Algoman orogeny

Philippines
Wawa, Orani, Bataan
Wawa, Pilar, Bataan, a barangay
Wawa, Abra de Ilog, Occidental Mindoro
Del Remedio, San Pablo, Laguna, a barangay commonly known as Wawa
 Wawa River (Agusan del Sur), a tributary of the Agusan River in the southern Philippines
Wawa River, a tributary of the Marikina River
Wawa Dam, Rizal Province

United States
Wawa, Pennsylvania, an unincorporated community
Wawa (SEPTA station), Middletown Township, Pennsylvania, train station

Elsewhere
Wawa River (Nicaragua)
Wawa, Sudan, a town
Wawa, Togo, a prefecture

Languages
Wawa language, a language of Cameroon
Chinook Jargon, also known as "the Wawa" or Chinuk Wawa

WAWA
Water Authority of Western Australia
WAWA (AM), a defunct AM radio station in Milwaukee, Wisconsin
WAWA-FM, a prior name of WLUM-FM, a radio station in Milwaukee

Other uses
Wawa or Triplochiton scleroxylon, an African tree
Wawa (company), a chain of convenience store/gas stations in the Mid-Atlantic and South regions of the United States
"Wawa," a song performed by Lizzy Mercier Descloux
Kamloops Wawa, a newspaper published in the Catholic Diocese of Kamloops, British Columbia, Canada, in the 1890s and 1900s
Wawa Hotel, a former resort hotel in Ontario, Canada

See also
 WA (disambiguation)
 Wah wah (disambiguation)

Language and nationality disambiguation pages
Lists of people by nickname